LAMD or lamd can refer to 
L-arginine maleate dihydrate, see Organic nonlinear optical materials
Lamedh - twelfth letter in many Semitic languages